Taşburun is a belde (town) in Iğdır Province, Turkey.

Geography
Taşburun is in Karakoyunlu district of Iğdır Province. Mount Ararat is to the south and Armenian border is to the east. The population of Taşburun is 1908  as of 2011.

History
According to mayor's page Taşburun was founded by Turkmen tribe named Taşburun after Seljuks annexed the area to their realm in 1064. In 1239 it was captured by the Mongols and in 1514 by the Ottoman Empire. It was ceded to Safavid Persia by the Treaty of Istanbul (1736) . In 1746 it was returned to Ottoman Empire by the Treaty of Kerden but lost to Russian Empire by the Treaty of San Stefano signed after the Russo-Turkish War (1877–1878). At the end of the First World War it was returned to Turkey. In 1993 it was declared a seat of township.

Population

Economy
Main economic sectors are agriculture and animal breeding. There is also a small flour factory.

References

External links 
  Official website of the Taşburun Municipality
  Official website of the Karakoyunlu District

Populated places in Iğdır Province
Towns in Turkey
Karakoyunlu District
Kurdish settlements in Turkey